Rosana Pastor Muñoz (born 7 August 1960) is a Spanish politician and actress.

Biography
Pastor studied at the School of Dramatic Art of Valencia (ESAD). She had classes under Antonio Díaz Zamora, Antonio Tordera and Francisco Romá (director of the film Tres en raya). She acted in Ken Loach's 1995 film Land and Freedom, alongside Ian Hart and Icíar Bollaín.

Apart from her extensive career as a film and television star, she has also acted and directed in theatre productions. She has acted in plays such as Pessoa en Persona; Les Troyens; Uncle Vanya; La pell en Flames; and as "Joan of Arc" at the Palau de les Arts, with the Orchestra and choir of the Cor de la Generalitat Valenciana. She directed and narrated the show "Enoch Arden", that integrates the music of Richard Strauss, narration and singing.

She was nominated for Best Supporting Actress at the 2002 Goya Awards for her role as Doña Elvira in Juana la Loca.

In November 2015 it was announced that she would run in the Spanish general election of the same year for Spanish left-wing political party Podemos in coalition with the left-wing Valencian nationalist Compromís. In the event, she was one of the elected MPs running for Valencia.

Selected filmography
 Las edades de Lulú (1990)
 Land and Freedom (1995)
 The Commissioner (1998)
 Leo (2000)
 Mad Love (2001)
 The Emperor's Wife (2003)
 La Conjura de El Escorial (2008)
 Wounded (2013)

External links

1960 births
Living people
Members of the 11th Congress of Deputies (Spain)
Members of the 12th Congress of Deputies (Spain)
People from Horta Nord
Spanish film actresses
Spanish television actresses
Women members of the Congress of Deputies (Spain)
20th-century Spanish actresses
21st-century Spanish actresses
Actresses from the Valencian Community